Barry Thomas Roberts (3 October 1933 – 26 October 2017) was a rugby union player who represented Australia.

Roberts, a wing, was born in Sydney and claimed one international rugby cap for Australia. He played for 
St Joseph's College, Hunters Hill. Roberts played for Manly Club Club where he played 135 first grade games and scored 678 points. He played nine games for New South Wales between 1953 and 1960.

Roberts made his test debut in 1956 in the Wallabies’ second match against South Africa at the Brisbane Exhibition Ground. He also played seven non-Test games for Australia.  Roberts also played against the British & Irish Lions for New South Wales in 1959.

Roberts was a talented hurdler in his youth.

References

Published sources
 Howell, Max (2006) Born to Lead – Wallaby Test Captains (2005) Celebrity Books, New Zealand

1933 births
2017 deaths
Australian rugby union players
Australia international rugby union players
People educated at St Joseph's College, Hunters Hill
Rugby union wings
Rugby union players from Sydney